Salvador Dalí Desert, also known as Dalí Valley (Valle de Dalí), is an extremely barren valley of southwestern Bolivia, in the Potosí Department. It is entirely contained within the borders of Eduardo Avaroa Andean Fauna National Reserve and is characterized by landscapes that resemble surrealist paintings by Salvador Dalí.

References

Deserts of Bolivia
Geography of Potosí Department
Salvador Dalí